Baquba Sport Club, is an Iraqi football team based in Baquba, Diyala, that plays in Iraq Division Three.

Managerial history
 Uday Nazhan

See also 
 2019–20 Iraq FA Cup

References

External links
 Baquba SC on Goalzz.com
 Iraq Clubs- Foundation Dates

2004 establishments in Iraq
Association football clubs established in 2004
Football clubs in Diyala